Serafín, is a Mexican telenovela fused with 3D animation for any characters produced by José Alberto Castro for Televisa in 1999.

Maribel Guardia, Eduardo Santamarina, María Fernanda Morales and Jordi Landeta star as the main protagonists, while Guillermo García Cantú and Enrique Rocha as the main antagonists.

Cast 

 Maribel Guardia as Carmen Quiñones de Salgado
 Eduardo Santamarina as Miguel Armendariz
 Jordi Landeta as Pepe Salgado Quiñones
 Maria Fernanda Morales as Serafín (voice)
 Jacqueline Andere as Alma de la Luz
 Enrique Rocha as Luciofer Nandez
 Pedro Armendáriz Jr. as Pensador (voice)
 German Robles as Don Baúl (voice)
 Carmen Montejo as Gigi (voice)
 Evita Muñoz "Chachita" as Coco (voice)
  Polo Ortín as Tacho (voice)
 Patricio Castillo as Krako (voice)
 Jorge Van Rankin as Pomin (voice)
 Guillermo García Cantú as Raúl Salgado
 Alejandra Obregón as Helga de Armendariz
 Rafael Rojas as Enrique
 Mónica Dossetti as Edith
 Eduardo Rodríguez as Bernal
 Jessica Salazar as Marcela Fernandez
 Adrián Vázquez as Jacobo
 Eduardo Rivera as Juancho
 Miguel Pizarro as Joaquín
 Miguel Galván as Roque
 Aída Pierce as Bárbara
 Daniel Arevalo as Javier
 Mariana Botas as Ana
 José Roberto Lozano as Eddy
 Paulina Martell as Lulú
 Jorge Arizmendi as Pancho
 Yurem Rojas as Cachito
 Eduardo Vaughan as Guampi
 María Alicia Delgado as Cachita
 Rosita Pelayo as Sandy
 Sergio DeFassio as Reintegro
 Luis Xavier as David
 Arlette Pacheco as Raquel
 Javier Herranz as Dany
 María Morena as Cecilia
 Alicia Montoya as Cruz
 Alejandra Meyer as Felicitas
 Ana Luisa Peluffo as Abuela Esther
 Juan Carlos Nava as Calixto Meneses
 Martha Mijares as Nena Gamba
 Julio Vega as Aníbal
 Horacio Almada as Lombardo
 Manuel Benítez as Lalo
 Andrés Bonfiglio as Chaparro
 Álvaro Carcaño asEvelio
 Eugenio Derbez as Lonje Moco
 Consuelo Duval as Lupe

References

External links 

1999 telenovelas
Televisa telenovelas
1999 Mexican television series debuts
1999 Mexican television series endings
Mexican telenovelas
Spanish-language telenovelas